Cove Mountain is a pair of mountain ridge lines in Perry County, south central Pennsylvania, in the United States. A  portion of the mountain was purchased by the Pennsylvania chapter of the Nature Conservancy in 2017, and is operated as a nature preserve that is open to the public.

References

Ridges of Pennsylvania
Landforms of Perry County, Pennsylvania